The Swift River is a river in Massachusetts. It has an east branch, a west branch, and a middle branch. It is a tributary of the Ware River. Part of it is dammed in the Swift River Valley to form the Quabbin Reservoir serving Boston and Eastern Massachusetts. Several towns were lost when the reservoir was constructed and filled.

Swift River Reservation is located along the east branch.

The former Academy at Swift River was located in Plainfield, Massachusetts. It is now a drug addiction treatment facility.

Letting Swift River Go, a picture book by Jane Yolen with watercolor illustrations by Barbara Cooney, describes the flooding of the valley to create the reservoir.

See also
Quabbin Aqueduct

References

Rivers of Massachusetts